Siparuna campii is a species of plant in the Siparunaceae family. It is endemic to Ecuador.

References

Flora of Ecuador
Siparunaceae
Endangered plants
Taxonomy articles created by Polbot